Tom Clancy's Ghost Recon is a tactical shooter video game developed by Red Storm Entertainment and published by Ubi Soft in 2001 for Microsoft Windows. It is the first game in the Ghost Recon series. It was ported to Mac OS, PlayStation 2 and Xbox in 2002 and to the GameCube in 2003. Ports for N-Gage and Game Boy Advance were planned, but later canceled. Unlike Clancy's other tactical shooter series, Rainbow Six, Ghost Recon is not based on any of his books.

Together with Rainbow Six, SWAT 3, and Operation Flashpoint, game industry experts generally credit Ghost Recon with defining and refining the tactical shooter genre. Ghost Recons success has spawned 2 expansion packs, Desert Siege and Island Thunder, as well as numerous sequels for video game consoles and the PC.

Gameplay
Ghost Recon puts the player in charge of the eponymous Ghosts, a fictional squad of United States Special Operations Forces soldiers from Delta Company, 1st Battalion, 5th Special Forces Group. They are organized into three fireteams named using the NATO phonetic alphabet: Alpha, Bravo, and Charlie, with space for three soldiers per team (the Xbox and PlayStation 2 versions do not have a Charlie team available). However, only six soldiers can be selected per mission. The player enjoys limited tactical control on the battlefield by issuing maneuver commands and rules of engagement for each fireteam through a command map.

The soldiers themselves are organized into four different character classes. Every class can carry a primary and secondary weapon, which are organized into "kits". Even though the primary weapon remains the same in all the kits (being defined by the soldier class — see below), there is a variety of equipment to be chosen as the secondary weapon.

Rifleman: The predominant soldier class in the game, riflemen can use a variety of different weapon kits. Their primary weapon is the M16 assault rifle. Secondaries include the M203 grenade launcher, the M9 pistol, spare magazines, or a pair of binoculars (in later versions these were replaced with deployable sensors, since binoculars were supplied to all Ghosts).
Support: Support soldiers provide a high volume of suppressive fire with the M249 Squad Automatic Weapon. As the soldier is equipped for short range, he also carries more armor. In addition to the machine gun, the support class may also carry the M9 (suppressed), M67 fragmentation grenades, or additional magazines.
Demolitions ("Demo"): Demolitions personnel are specialists in destroying large structures and can serve in the anti-tank role. Their primary weapon is the M4 carbine. This soldier can also be equipped with demolition charges, grenades, extra magazines, Claymore mines, or the M136 AT4 anti-tank rocket.
Sniper: Distinguishable by their ghillie suits, the sniper can provide fire support over long ranges while hidden. Primarily equipped with the U.S. Army's M24 rifle, they can also be equipped with the standard and silenced M9, extra magazines or grenades.

For every completed mission in the single-player campaign, each soldier that survives gains one Combat Point to upgrade their attributes. There are four basic categories of skill:
Weapon: affects the accuracy and aiming of the weapon; the reticule will close faster and tighter as more points are added.
Stealth: enhances the ability of the soldier to remain undetected and reduces noise generated by the soldier moving.
Endurance: improves recovery time when taking hits, increases the soldier's ability to survive a wound and reduces the effect of heavy equipment on speed.
Leadership: for every three points of skill, all other soldiers in the same fireteam gain an extra point to each of their statistics. The bonus can only apply if the soldier with the high leadership skill is the fireteam's point man.

The player also unlocks "specialists" from NATO or allied countries by completing extra mission objectives. The specialists are more experienced than the Ghosts and have more Combat Points, making them an essential part of the team. They are also equipped with weapons not available to standard soldiers. Two specialists are armed with the Objective Individual Combat Weapon, as part of field tests and implementation of the U.S. Army's Land Warrior program. The specialist corps includes three women, who are the only female combatants in the game.

The game is played entirely from the first-person perspective. A heads-up display relays information such as the name of the soldier the player is controlling, the soldier's assigned fireteam, weapon and ammo counter, a threat indicator, the targeting reticule, health status, and a stance indicator (to show whether the character is standing, crouched, or prone).

Bullets will not penetrate most objects, but they will break glass and deflate tires. Explosives or heavy gunfire can be used to destroy wooden doors, and (in the case of explosives) potentially kill anyone within the blast radius on the other side. Depending on a target's armor, it is generally possible to neutralize a threat with one or two well-placed shots.

If a soldier is rendered "out of action" during a mission, he or she is considered to be dead, and not available for the rest of the campaign. Wounded soldiers who survive a mission will remain wounded unless they are replaced with a healthy soldier for the next mission.

Ghost Recon has both single player and multiplayer modes of play. Up to 36 players are supported in the PC version's multiplayer over an internet (TCP/IP) connection or LAN.

Plot
An ultranationalist regime takes control of the Russian government in Moscow, installing its leader Dmitri Arbatov as president. Russia then takes control over Ukraine, Belarus, and Kazakhstan, forming the Russian Democratic Union (RDU), a political and military alliance dedicated to recreating the former Soviet Union.

In April 2008, the U.S. Army's elite "Ghost" soldiers battle South Ossetian separatist rebels who are harassing the Georgian government and their allies. Their presence forces the RDU to complain to the United Nations that the U.S. has interfered in their internal affairs. The Russian army invades Georgia to assist the rebels. The Ghosts slow down the Russian advance while foreign civilians are evacuated from the country. Eventually, the Ghosts are all that's left of U.S. forces in Georgia and take the last helicopter out of the U.S. embassy in Tbilisi just as Russian forces arrive. The Georgian government sets up a government-in-exile in Geneva, Switzerland while the RDU annexes Georgia, an act publicly condemned by the United States, United Kingdom, and Germany.
	 
The Ghosts are soon sent to the Baltic states in response to a Russian invasion launched three days ahead of NATO intelligence estimates. The Ghosts attempt to slow down the attack to buy time for NATO units to arrive in force, with the closest of them coming from Germany. The Ghosts fight alongside U.S. Army elements to push the Russians out of the Baltics, with victories in Rēzekne, Latvia, and Venta Utena, Vilnius, Lithuania. The defeat takes its toll on the RDU government with President Arbatov largely blamed for the disaster and put under house arrest.
	 
The Ghosts enter Russia with their first mission being to free U.S. POWs and Russian political prisoners opposed to the RDU. The Russian military executes President Arbatov, which sparks a nationwide rebellion bordering on civil war. The ultranationalists quickly lose public support and many members of the RDU government quit the alliance. The Ghosts later attack several Russian bases such as a naval base at Murmansk and an airbase at Arkhangel'sk, weakening the ultranationalists' combat power. The RDU attracts strong international condemnation and practically dissolve after they detonate a nuclear weapon during a battle north of Moscow between the ultranationalists and a joint force of U.S. and rebelling Russian combat units.
	
Acting Russian Prime Minister Karpin privately requests additional NATO aid in the fighting, prompting the entire 1st Armored Division to be sent over the Russian border. The Ghosts spearhead a NATO assault on Moscow by cutting through a strong ultranationalist defensive line in the woods outside the capital. On November 10, 2008, NATO forces finally reach a deserted Moscow, with the last ultranationalist defenders holed up inside the Kremlin. After a final assault by the Ghosts in Red Square, the ultranationalists surrender and both the Americans and the newly liberated Russians celebrate their victory.

Development
The game was in development as early as November 2000. Motion capture was used for character animation. The lead designer was Brian Upton and the soundtrack was composed by Bill Brown.

Expansion packs and related games
Tom Clancy's Ghost Recon: Desert Siege is a 2002 expansion pack, released for Microsoft Windows as a separate purchase and can be unlocked as a new campaign in the PS2 version of Tom Clancy's Ghost Recon. It is also bundled with the Mac port. The expansion pack adds 2 new multiplayer game types (Domination and Siege), 5 new multiplayer maps, new weapons for use in multiplayer, and an eight-mission single player campaign, which also unlocks a new specialist soldier (Jodit Haile). In the PS2 version, players who start Desert Siege by finishing the Ghost Recon campaign first will also retain the soldiers they used in the campaign, including their statistics.

Tom Clancy's Ghost Recon: Island Thunder was released in late 2002 as an expansion pack for Microsoft Windows, and as a standalone game for Xbox. It contains eight new single player missions, 12 new weapons, 5 new dedicated multiplayer maps, 3 new multiplayer modes (Cat and Mouse, Defend, and Behemoth). On the Xbox, Island Thunder features five additional missions and twelve multiplayer maps.

Tom Clancy's Ghost Recon: Island Thunder was never released for the PlayStation 2, but its content was combined with eight new single-player missions set in Colombia and additional multiplayer maps and released under the title Tom Clancy's Ghost Recon: Jungle Storm in 2004.

In addition to the official expansion packs, the very active Ghost Recon modding scene (over 1,000 mods have been published as of January 2013) has produced a large number of unofficial expansions packs for PC.  Free expansions like Frostbite, CENTCOM, Heroes Unleashed, and Year of the Monkey (among others) have gained huge popularity, with download counts in the hundreds of thousands.

Reception

Tom Clancy's Ghost Recon received "mixed or average" for the Gamecube and PS2 versions while the Xbox and PC versions received "generally positive" reviews, according to review aggregator Metacritic.

Ghost Recon was a commercial success. By the end of 2001, sales of its computer version had reached 430,000 units. The series' sales surpassed 760,000 copies by the end of March 2002. In the United States, the computer version of Ghost Recon sold 240,000 copies and earned $10.1 million by August 2006. Edge named it the country's 83rd best-selling computer game between January 2000 and August 2006. Combined sales of all Ghost Recon series computer games released between those dates had reached 620,000 in the United States by August 2006. The computer version of Ghost Recon also received a "Silver" sales award from the Entertainment and Leisure Software Publishers Association (ELSPA), indicating sales of at least 100,000 copies in the United Kingdom.

Sales of the game's PlayStation 2 and Xbox versions surpassed 2 million copies by the end of June 2003, and helped to drive Ubisoft's Q1 2003/2004 revenues to a record high for the company. By July 2006, the PlayStation 2 version of Ghost Recon had sold 1.1 million copies and earned $39 million in the United States alone. Next Generation ranked it as the 46th highest-selling game launched for the PlayStation 2, Xbox or GameCube between January 2000 and July 2006 in that country.

Awards
The editors of PC Gamer US presented Ghost Recon with their 2001 "Best Sound" and overall "Game of the Year" awards, and wrote that "few games have made us cringe in shock, roar with aggression, or exult in victory the way Ghost Recon has." Tom Clancy's Ghost Recon was also named Best Game of the Year in 2001 by IGN. Ghost Recon was a runner-up in IGN's "Best Action Game 2001" and "Best Use Of Sound" ("Reader's Choice"). Wargamer gave it three bronze awards in "Game of the Year", awarded Red Storm with "Game Developer of the Year", and gave "Game Publisher of the Year" to Ubisoft.

Ghost Recons Xbox version won GameSpots 2002 "Best Sound on Xbox" award, and was nominated for "Best Online Game on Xbox" and "Best Shooter on Xbox".

Legacy

Plot coincidence
In August 2008, the Russo-Georgian war began, with a number of commentators noting on the coincidence, that this real world event was somewhat similar to the plot of Tom Clancy's Ghost Recon.

References

External links
 

2001 video games
Cancelled Game Boy Advance games
Classic Mac OS games
GameCube games
Multiplayer and single-player video games
PlayStation 2 games
Red Storm Entertainment games
Tom Clancy games
 01
Ubisoft games
Video games developed in the United States
Video games featuring female protagonists
Video games scored by Bill Brown
Video games set in 2008
Video games set in a fictional country
Video games set in Georgia (country)
Video games set in Latvia
Video games set in Lithuania
Video games set in Moscow
Video games set in North Carolina
Video games set in Russia
Video games with expansion packs
Vilnius in fiction
Windows games
Works about the Russo-Georgian War
Xbox games